Jarkko Nieminen was the defending champion, but lost to eventual champion Bernard Tomic in the quarterfinals.
It was Tomic's first ATP title and his first final; he defeated Kevin Anderson 6–3, 6–7(2–7), 6–3 in the final.

Seeds

Draw

Finals

Top half

Bottom half

Qualifying

Seeds

Qualifiers

Draw

First qualifier

Second qualifier

Third qualifier

Fourth qualifier

References

 Main Draw
 Qualifying Draw

M